Vampire Ecstasy is the debut studio album by Japanese Darkwave duo, Aural Vampire. The album was released independently on March 22, 2004.

Track listing

External links
Official Website

References

2004 albums